The 2022 Idaho gubernatorial election was held on November 8, 2022, to elect the next governor of Idaho. Incumbent Republican Governor Brad Little, first elected in 2018, was re-elected for a second term. Republicans have won the previous seven elections for governor.

The statewide primary was held on May 17, 2022. Little defeated incumbent Lieutenant Governor Janice McGeachin in the Republican primary, while Stephen Heidt won the Democratic primary. Little then convincingly won the general election, but there was a relatively strong performance by right-wing independent candidate Ammon Bundy. Bundy finished roughly three points behind Heidt, and finished in second place ahead of Heidt in 34 of Idaho's 44 counties. This was the worst Democratic performance since 1924, and one of only three times since then where the Democratic candidate failed to achieve 30% of the vote. Bundy's share of the vote was the best third-party performance since 1926.

Republican primary

Candidates

Nominee
Brad Little, incumbent governor

Eliminated in primary
Steve Bradshaw, Bonner County commissioner
Ben Cannady, candidate for governor in 2018
Walter French
Ed Humphreys, financial advisor and Region IV chair of the Idaho Republican Party
Ashley Jackson, actress, marijuana legalization activist
Lisa Marie, entrepreneur, humanitarian, mother
Janice McGeachin, lieutenant governor of Idaho
Cody Usabel

Withdrawn
Ammon Bundy, anti-government militant, activist, and leader of the Occupation of the Malheur National Wildlife Refuge (running as an independent) 
Chris Hammond

Declined 
 Raúl Labrador, former U.S. representative from ID-01, former chair of the Idaho Republican Party, and candidate for governor in 2018 (running for Idaho Attorney General)

Endorsements

Polling

Primary results

Democratic primary

Candidates

Nominee
Stephen Heidt, college instructor

Write-in candidates
Shelby Rognstad, mayor of Sandpoint (failed to change party registration and running as write-in candidate instead)
David J. Reilly, activist and media personality

Withdrew
Melissa Sue Robinson, perennial candidate

Declined
AJ Balukoff, former Boise School District trustee, nominee for governor in 2014, and candidate in 2018 (endorsed Shelby Rognstad)

Endorsements

Primary results

Libertarian primary

Candidates

Declared
 Paul Sand, White Bird city councilman, retired software engineer
John Dionne Jr.

Primary results

Constitution primary

Candidates

Declared
 Chantyrose Davison

Write In
 Ryan Cole, member of the Central Idaho Health District board and pathologist (failed to change party registration and running as write-in candidate instead)

Withdrew
 Pro-Life, organic strawberry farmer and perennial candidate (running for lieutenant governor)

Primary results

Independents

Declared
Ammon Bundy, Leader of the Occupation of the Malheur National Wildlife Refuge

Withdrawn
John Dionne (running as a Libertarian)
Pro Life (running for lieutenant governor)

General election

Predictions

Endorsements

Results

See also

2022 Idaho lieutenant gubernatorial election
List of governors of Idaho
Elections in Idaho
 2022 Idaho elections

Notes

References

External links
Official campaign websites
 Ammon Bundy (I) for Governor
 Chantyrose Davison (C) for Governor
 Stephen Heidt (D) for Governor
 Brad Little (R) for Governor
 Paul Sand (L) for Governor

Governor
2022
Idaho